Plug It In is the fourth album by Dutch rock band Krezip. It is their second album on their new label Sony BMG. The album was released on May 11, 2007. It notably features a disco-inspired sound on most of its songs as opposed to the alternative rock sound of earlier albums. This was because the band decided they needed a big change to their sound after ten years. Lead singer Jacqueline Govaert decided to base this new sound on bands such as Blondie and The Sounds; in fact, members Jesper Anderberg and Felix Rodriguez of The Sounds co-wrote some of the album's tracks.

A special edition of the album was released on February 29, 2008.

Track listing

 "Play This Game With Me" (Jacqueline Govaert, Felix Rodriguez, Jesper Anderberg) - 04:00
 "Life Is Sweet" (Govaert, Adel Dahdal, Peter Mansson) - 03:31
 "Plug It In & Turn Me On" (Govaert, JanPeter Hoekstra) - 03:41
 "Ordinary Day" (Govaert, Hoekstra) - 03:27
 "Can't You Be Mine" (Govaert, Wizardz of Oz) - 03:02
 "Easy Way Out" (Govaert, Hoekstra) - 03:13
 "Not Tonight" (Govaert, Malcolm Pardon, Fredrik Rinman) - 04:10
 "Bored" (Govaert, Malcolm Pardon, Fredrik Rinman) - 03:29
 "You're Wrong" (Govaert, Rodriguez, Anderberg) - 03:25
 "Hey There Love" (Govaert, Hoekstra) - 04:35
 "All My Life" (Govaert, Rodriguez, Anderberg) - 03:36
 Bonus tracks on Special Edition:
 "Everybody's Gotta Learn Sometime" (James Warren) - 04:27
 "Plug It In & Turn Me On" - Live @ HMH (Govaert, Hoekstra) - 03:43
 "I Would Stay" - Live @ HMH (Govaert) - 06:39
 "All My Life" - Live @ HMH (Govaert, Rodriguez, Anderberg) - 04:00
 "Venus" - Live @ HMH (Robbie van Leeuwen) - 03:21
 "Look What You've Done" (Govaert, Hoekstra) - 02:16

Credits
Band members:
Jacqueline Govaert - Vocals, piano
Anne Govaert - Guitars, backing vocals
JanPeter Hoekstra - Guitars
Annelies Kuijsters - Keyboards, backing vocals
Joost van Haaren - Bass
Bram van den Berg - Drums

Personnel:
Adel Dahdal & Peter Mansson - Recording, production and mixing (Original album tracks)
Djoum - Assistant engineer
Bjorn Engelmann - Mastering (Original album tracks)
Pontus Hagberg - String arrangements on "All My Life" and "Ordinary Day"
Tijmen Zinkhaan - Production, recording and mixing on "Everybody's Gotta Learn Sometime" and live bonus tracks
JanPeter Hoekstra & Hans Hanneman - Recording and mixing on "Look What You've Done"
Darius van Helfteren - Mastering (bonus tracks)
Ruud Baan - Photography
Pascal Duval - Art direction and design

Charts

Weekly charts

Year-end charts

References

Krezip albums
2007 albums